Cédric Lécluse (born March 29, 1972) is a French former professional football defender. He is the manager of Troyes AC's U16 squad.

Career
Lecluse was born in Épinay-sur-Seine. He spent the majority of his career with AS Nancy. He played for Nancy from 1991 to 2002 before leaving to play in China for Shanghai Cosco. After a year in China he returned to Nancy and played there until 2007. He then signed for Angers SCO but had a disappointing spell there and after leaving he decided to retire.

References

External links
 
 

1972 births
Living people
Sportspeople from Épinay-sur-Seine
Association football defenders
French footballers
French football managers
Ligue 1 players
AS Nancy Lorraine players
Angers SCO players
Expatriate footballers in China
Footballers from Seine-Saint-Denis